The National Points Championship is a season-long competition for BriSCA Formula 1 Stock Cars. The winner is granted the honour of racing with a silver roof for the following season.

History
The first season-long championship started in 1956. Drivers' scores at every stock car meeting were recorded to create the championship table. During the late 1990s, when Frankie Wainman Junior dominated, there was criticism that the National Points Championship was predictable and favoured drivers who had the money to race at as many meetings as possible. The National Series was created in 2002. Rather than the points accumulated over the entire season counting towards the winner, the National Series was competed for over 35 designated meetings. The season-long National Points Championship survived, but its importance was downgraded, and the privilege of racing with a silver roof for the following season was transferred from it to the National Series.

In 2009, the National Series was amended. This time, the top ten points-scoring drivers over the first two-thirds of the season were entered in the National Series Shootout, beginning with no points except for a small number of meeting attendance points. The drivers raced over ten designated Shootout rounds, with the points scored in them deciding the winner of the National Series. In 2010, the number of competing drivers was increased to twelve. From 2012, the National Series Shootout was rebranded the National Points Championship Shootout.

The most successful driver in National Points Championships and National Series is Frankie Wainman Junior, who has won fourteen. Other notable multiple winners include Stuart Smith (thirteen), John Lund (six), Fred Mitchell (three), Andy Smith (three) and Frankie Wainman (three).

List of winners

References

External links
 National Points Championship information at F1stockcars.com
 National Series/Points statistics at BriSCAF1stox.com

Stock car racing in the United Kingdom
Stock car racing series
Auto racing series in the United Kingdom
Motorsport competitions in the United Kingdom